Kafr Lam was a Palestinian Arab village located 26 kilometres (16 mi) south of Haifa on the Mediterranean coast. The name of the village was shared with that of an Islamic fort constructed there early in the period of Arab Caliphate rule (638–1099 CE) in Palestine. To the Crusaders, both the fort and the village, which they controlled for some time in the 13th century, were known as Cafarlet.

Kafr Lam was depopulated during the 1948 Arab-Israeli war. While the village was largely destroyed, some of its former structures and their ruins can be seen in the Israeli moshav of HaBonim, established on the lands of Kafr Lam in 1949.

History

Early Muslim period
According to the Arab geographer Yaqut al-Hamawi, the town of Kafr Lam was established near Qisarya by the Umayyad caliph Hisham ibn ´Abd al-Malik (AD 724-743). The fort built, in the shape of a Roman castrum, was erected during the late Umayyad or early Abbasid period, as a ribat meant to guard against attacks from the sea and invasion by the former rulers, the Byzantines.

Crusader period

Kafr Lam was a fiefdom of the lord of Caesarea during the Crusader period, and was known at this time as Cafarlet. In 1200, Cafarlet was granted to a vassal by the Lord of Caesarea, Aymar de Lairon.

In October 1213, Aymar de Lairon pledged the casalis of Cafarlet and two fiefdoms as surety for a debt of 1,000 besants he had taken from the Hospitallers.
In 1232, the Casal of Cafarlet was sold to the Hospitallers for 16,000 Saracen besants, the increased value being a result of it having been fortified after a raid on the lordship of Caesarea by troops from Damascus in 1227.

The Hospitallers transferred ownership over Carfalet to the Templars by 1255. 
In 1262 the final exchange of the land of Kafr Lam took place between the  Templars and the  Hospitallers, leaving Kafr Lam under Templar control.

The village was captured by Muslim forces in 1265, but retaken by the Crusaders shortly thereafter. In 1291, it was taken by the Mamluks, who ruled over it from that time until the expansion of the Ottoman Empire into Palestine in the early sixteenth century.

Ottoman period
During early Ottoman rule in Palestine, in 1596, a farm in Kafr Lam paid taxes to the ruling authorities.  Pierre Jacotin named  the village Kofour el An on his map from 1799.

Descriptions of Kfar Lam under later Ottoman rule are available in the writings of European travellers to the region. For example,  Mary Rogers, the sister of the British vice-consul in Haifa, visited Kafr Lam in 1856 and wrote that its houses were built of mud and stone and that the fields around the village abounded in Indian wheat, millet, sesame, tobacco, and orchards. In 1859, consul Rogers estimated the population to be 120, and the cultivation to be 16 feddans.

French explorer Victor Guérin visited in 1870 and noted that Kafr Lam was situated on top of a small hill and was inhabited by about 300 villagers. He further wrote that the village stood within a large stone enclosure that dated to the time of the Crusades.

In 1883, the PEF's Survey of Western Palestine described Kafr Lam as a small village of adobe hovels crowded within the ancient walls.

A population list from about 1887 showed that  Kefr Lam had about 180 inhabitants, all Muslim.

In modern times, the houses of Kafr Lam were made of stone and either mud or cement and were clustered together. The villagers were Muslims, and maintained a mosque. A boys elementary school was built in 1882, but it was closed during the period of the British Mandate in Palestine.

British Mandate
In the 1922 census of Palestine conducted by the British Mandate authorities, Kufr Lam had a population 156, all Muslims, increasing in the  1931 census to 215, still all  Muslims, in a total of 50 houses.

There were five wells on village lands. The village economy depended on animal husbandry and agriculture and the main crops cultivated were various sorts of grain.

In  the 1945 statistics, Kafr Lam  had a population of 340 Muslim inhabitants, and the total land area was 6,838 dunams. Of the land, a total of 75 dunams was for plantations and irrigable land,  for cereals, while 14 dunams were built-up land.

1948 Arab-Israeli war and aftermath
Kafr Lam was evacuated early in May 1948, but by mid-May some of the villagers had returned. On 15 May 1948, the first day of the 1948 Arab-Israeli war, troops from the Carmeli Brigade occupied Kafr Lam and neighbouring Sarafand, and briefly garrisoned the two villages. Both villages were re-occupied and cleared of their inhabitants by mid-July 1948. This operation involved the first use of support fire from Israeli naval forces, with two warships participating in the attack, aiming light-weapons fire at Kafr Lam and Sarafand.

After the start of the Second Truce, on 19 July 1948, units of the Israel Defense Forces (IDF) units continued to destroy Palestinian villages in various parts of the country. However, special interest groups, such as archaeologists, began to complain, calling for curbs on IDF destructiveness. Thus, on 7 October, Haifa District HQ ordered the 123rd Battalion to stop all demolition activities in "Qisarya, Atlit, Kafr Lam and Tiberias"; all of which contained Roman or Crusader era ruins.

Following the war the area was incorporated into the State of Israel. The moshavim of HaBonim and Ein Ayala were established on Kafr Lam's village lands in 1949. 

In 1992, the village site was described as "[t]he abandoned Crusader fortress and several houses are still standing. One house, that of Ahmad Bey Khalil, has been converted into a school; another is being used as an Israeli post office."

Demographics
The population (includes Kafr Lam Station) was 215 in 1931. In 1944/45 the population was 340.

See also
Depopulated Palestinian locations in Israel

References

Bibliography

   (29)

External links
Welcome To Kafr Lam
Kafr Lam, Zochrot
Survey of Western Palestine, Map 7:  IAA, Wikimedia commons

Arab villages depopulated during the 1948 Arab–Israeli War
Geography of Palestine (region)
Castles and fortifications of the Knights Hospitaller
District of Haifa